Qara Elxan oğlu Qarayev (born 12 October 1992) is an Azerbaijani professional footballer who plays as a midfielder for Azerbaijan Premier League club Qarabağ and the Azerbaijan national team. He has been twice selected as the footballer of the year in Azerbaijan in 2014 and 2020.

Personal life 
Qara Qarayev was born on 12 October 1992 in Füzuli.

Club career
On 22 May 2019, Qarayev signed a new two-year contract with Qarabağ.

Career statistics

Club

International
Statistics accurate as of match played 17 June 2022

Honours

Club
Qarabağ FK
Azerbaijan Premier League: (7) 2013–14, 2014–15, 2015–16, 2016–17, 2017–18, 2018-19, 2019-20
Azerbaijan Cup: (3) 2008–09, 2014–15, 2015–16

Individual
Azerbaijani Footballer of the Year (2): 2014, 2020

References

External links
 
 Profile on official club website
 

1992 births
People from Füzuli
Living people
Azerbaijani footballers
Azerbaijan youth international footballers
Azerbaijan under-21 international footballers
Azerbaijan international footballers
Association football midfielders
Qarabağ FK players
Azerbaijan Premier League players